Ulrich L. Lehner (born 1976 in Straubing, Bavaria, Germany) is the Warren Foundation Professor of Theology at the University of Notre Dame. He is a trained philosopher, theologian and historian.

Life 
From 1996 to 2003 he also studied history. In 2006 he received his PhD in theology from the Universität Regensburg with a thesis on the concept of providence of Immanuel Kant and Protestant school philosophy. In 2015 the received the degree of habilitated doctor in history from the Central European University with his award winning book Enlightened Monks; it was the first ever habilitation awarded at the CEU. From 2006 to 2019 he was professor of historical theology and religious history at Marquette University in Milwaukee.

In 2013 he declined a job offer for a professorship in German Literature at the University of Kansas  and in 2019 for the Warren Chair at Duke Divinity School. Since July 2019 he is the William K. Warren Foundation professor of Theology at the University of Notre Dame. His main research areas are religious history of Early Modernity and the Enlightenment as well as intellectual history from the Renaissance to the present. Especially his studies on the Catholic Enlightenment have received international acclaim. 

Apart from global Enlightenment studies, he researches the intellectual diversity of modern Catholicism, the history of gender relations, and the history of the Romani within Catholicism. In twentieth century history, is focus is on the relationship of Catholics to German Nazi ideology. Since 2014 he is a member of the European Academy of Sciences and Arts, since 2018 of the Accademia Ambrosiana, and since 2022 of the Academia Europea.

Lehner is member and former Herodotus Fellow of the Institute for Advanced Study in Princeton, was twice  Distinguished Fellow at the Notre Dame Institute for Advanced Study, twice research fellow of the Earhart Foundation and senior fellow of the Alexander von Humboldt Foundation as well as the Carl Friedrich von Siemens Foundation, and visiting professor at the Catholic University of Eichstätt-Ingolstadt, the University of Hamburg and the University of Pennsylvania.

Publications (selected) 
As sole author:
 Historia Magistra. Zur Archivgeschichte des altbayerischen Kollegiatstiftes SS. Jakobus und Tiburtius in Straubing. Nordhausen 2003, .
 Kants Vorsehungskonzept auf dem Hintergrund der deutschen Schulphilosophie und -theologie. Leiden and Boston: Brill, 2007, .
 Enlightened Monks. The German Benedictines 1740–1803. Oxford: Oxford University Press 2011, .
Monastic Prisons and Torture Chambers. Crime and Punishment in Central European Monasteries, 1600–1800. Eugene: Wipf and Stock, 2013, .
Mönche und Nonnen im Klosterkerker. Ein verdrängtes Kapitel Kirchengeschichte. Kevelaer: ToposPlus 2015, . Completely rewritten and enlarged German edition of Monastic Prisons.
 On the Road to Vatican II. German Catholic Enlightenment and Reform of the Church. Augsburg: Fortress Press, 2016, 
 The Catholic Enlightenment. The Forgotten History of a Global Movement. Oxford/New York: Oxford University Press 2016, .
 Die katholische Aufklärung. Weltgeschichte einer Reformbewegung. Paderborn 2017, . German translation.
 Katalikų Apšvieta. Pamiršta pasaulinio judėjimo istorija. Vox Altera, Vilnius 2018, . Lithuanian translation.
 Illuminismo cattolico. La storia dimenticata di un movimento globale. Milan, Edizione studium, 2022. ISBN 978-8838251306. Italian translation.
 God is not nice. Ave Maria Press, 2017, .
Dios no Mola. Homo Legens, 2019, . Spanish translation.
Gott ist unbequem. Herder Verlag, 2019. . German translation.
Bóg nie jest miły. Pułapka pluszowego chrześcijaństwa. W Drodze, 2020 . Polish translation.
Deus não é avô. Laisnova – Edição e Formação: Artis, 2020. . Portuguese translation.
Dieu n'est pas un chic type. Artège: 2022. ISBN 979-1033612100. French translation.
Think Better. Unlocking the Power of Reason. Baker Academic Press 2021. ISBN 978-1540964779.
The Inner Life of Catholic REform. From the Council of Trent to the Enlightenment. Oxford/New York: Oxford University Press, 2022. ISBN 978-0197620601. 
As sole editor:
 Martin Knutzen-Beweis von der Wahrheit der christlichen Religion  (1747). Bautz 2006, .
 Johann Poiger – Theologie ohne Hexen und Zauberer (1780). Religionsgeschichte der Frühen Neuzeit Bd. 4. Bautz. 2006. .
 Religion nach Kant. Texte aus dem Werk des Kantianers Johann Heinrich Tieftrunk. Religionsgeschichte der Frühen Neuzeit Bd. 3. Bautz, 2007. .
 Die scholastische Theologie im Zeitalter der Gnadenstreitigkeiten I: Neue Texte von Diego Paez (†1582), Diego del Mármol (†1664) und Gregor von Valencia (†1603). Religionsgeschichte der Frühen Neuzeit Bd. 2. Bautz, 2007. 
 Johann Nikolaus von Hontheim: Justinus Febronius – De Statu Ecclesiae. Abbreviatus et Emendatus (1777). Religionsgeschichte der frühen Neuzeit Bd. 5. Bautz, 2008. 
 Johann Nikolaus von Hontheim: Justinus Febronius – Commentarius in Suam Retractationem. Religionsgeschichte der frühen Neuzeit Bd. 6.  Bautz, 2008. 
 Beda Mayr-Vertheidigung der katholischen Religion (1789). Brill, 2009, .
 Klostergericht und -kerker. Der "Criminalprocess der Franciscaner" (1769). Religionsgeschichte der frühen Neuzeit Bd. 14. Nordhausen: Bautz, 2012. 
 Paul Simon—The Human Element in the Church of Christ (1936). With an Introduction by Ulrich L. Lehner. Eugene, OR: Wipf and Stock, 2016. .
 Otto Michael Knab's Fox Fables. Wipf and Stock, 2017, .
 Women, Enlightenment and Catholicism. Routledge, 2017, .
 Innovation in Early Modern Catholicism. London and New York: Routledge, 2022.  As coeditor:
 with R. Tacelli: Kontroverse Theologie. Nova et Vetera, 2005, vergriffen.
 with R. Tacelli: Kant, Lonergan und der christliche Glaube. Bautz, 2005, .
 with Michael Printy: Brills Companion to the Catholic Enlightenment. Brill, 2010, .
 with Jeff Burson: Enlightenment and Catholicism in Europe. University of Notre Dame Press, 2014. .
 with G. Roeber, R. Muller: Oxford Handbook of Early Modern Theology, 1500–1800. Oxford/New York: Oxford University Press, 2016, . Paperback: 2018.
 with R. Tacelli u. a.: Wort und Wahrheit. Fragen der Erkenntnistheorie. Festschrift f. Harald Schöndorf. Kohlhammer Verlag, Stuttgart 2019, .
 Catholic Enlightenment. A Global Anthology. Edited with Shaun Blanchard. Washington: Catholic University of America Press, 2021. ISBN 978-0813233987.

As series editor
Early Modern Catholic Sources. Catholic University of America Press
Religionsgeschichte der Frühen Neuzeit. Bautz Verlag.
Catholicisms, 1450–1800. Boydell and Brewer-Durham University Press, UK

Sources

External links 
 academia.edu
 University of Notre Dame: Dr. Ulrich L. Lehner

21st-century German historians
21st-century German Catholic theologians
University of Notre Dame faculty
German historians of religion
1976 births
Living people